Thuận Châu is a township and capital of Thuận Châu District, Sơn La Province, Vietnam.

References

Populated places in Sơn La province
District capitals in Vietnam
Townships in Vietnam